The Geometry E is a battery-powered subcompact crossover produced by Chinese auto manufacturer Geely under the Geometry brand.

Overview

The Geometry E is officially the third brand new model of the Geometry brand, while replacing the short-lived Geometry EX3 sold in 2021 alone. It was developed based on the same platform as the Geely Vision X3 and the Geometry EX3 rebadged variant, and comes in three trims; Cute Tiger, Linglong Tiger, and Thunder Tiger. Pricing of the Geometry E starts at $12,947 (86,800 yuan) for the base model, while the Linglong Tiger and Thunder Tiger costs around $14,588 and $15,483 respectively. 

The battery of the Geometry E is a base 33.5 kWh and a longer-range 39.4 kWh lithium iron phosphate battery providing a NEDC range of  respectively. The electric motor is a TZ160XS601 drive motor produced by GLB Intelligent Power Technologies capable of producing 60 kW and 130 Nm of torque, giving it a top speed of 121 km/h. Charge time for the Geometry E from 0-80% is 30 minutes. 

The interior of the Geometry E features two 10.25-inch infotainment screens and a central control screen as standard.

References

External links
 Geometry Official Website

Crossover sport utility vehicles
Hatchbacks
Front-wheel-drive vehicles
Subcompact cars
Cars introduced in 2022
2020s cars
Cars of China
Production electric cars